George Lawrence Mikan III (born April 8, 1948) is an American former professional basketball player.

The son of Hall of Famer George Mikan and nephew of Ed Mikan, Larry Mikan prepped at Benilde High School (now Benilde-St. Margaret's) where he played center. In college, he competed for the University of Minnesota in the late 1960s and early 1970s. After graduating, he played one season with the Cleveland Cavaliers of the National Basketball Association. He averaged 3.0 points and 2.6 rebounds in 53 games.

See also
List of second-generation National Basketball Association players

References

1948 births
Living people
American men's basketball players
Basketball players from Saint Paul, Minnesota
Cleveland Cavaliers players
Los Angeles Lakers draft picks
Minnesota Golden Gophers men's basketball players
Power forwards (basketball)
American people of Croatian descent
American people of Lithuanian descent